Lev Nikolayevich Venediktov (6 October 1924, Tambov – 10 December 2017, Kyiv) was a Soviet and Ukrainian choral conductor and pedagogue. People's Artist of the USSR (1979) and Hero of Ukraine (2004).

References

External links

1924 births
2017 deaths
People from Tambov
Communist Party of the Soviet Union members
Kyiv Conservatory alumni
Academic staff of Kyiv Conservatory
People's Artists of the USSR
Commanders of the Order of Merit of the Italian Republic
Recipients of the Order of Honour (Russia)
Recipients of the Order of Prince Yaroslav the Wise, 3rd class
Recipients of the Order of Prince Yaroslav the Wise, 4th class
Recipients of the Order of Prince Yaroslav the Wise, 5th class
Recipients of the Order of the Red Banner of Labour
Recipients of the Order of State
Recipients of the Shevchenko National Prize
Recipients of the title of People's Artists of Ukraine
Ukrainian choral conductors
Ukrainian classical musicians
Ukrainian conductors (music)
Ukrainian music educators
Soviet classical musicians
Soviet conductors (music)
Soviet music educators
Burials at Baikove Cemetery
Recipients of the Honorary Diploma of the Cabinet of Ministers of Ukraine